Petr Prajsler (born September 21, 1965) is a Czech former professional ice hockey defenceman who played in the National Hockey League for the Los Angeles Kings between 1987 and 1990 and the Boston Bruins in 1991. He also played several seasons in the Czech Republic. Internationally Prajsler played for the Czechoslovak national junior team at the 1985 World Junior Championships, winning a silver medal.

Prajsler began his career with Tesla Pardubice in 1984 where he spent three seasons. He was drafted 93rd overall by Los Angeles in the 1985 NHL Entry Draft and played 43 regular season games for the Kings over three seasons, scoring three goals and ten assists.  In 1990, Prajsler moved to the International Hockey League and joined the Phoenix Roadrunners where in 77 games, he scored 13 goals and 47 points, his most productive season.

He was signed by the Boston Bruins as a free-agent the next year, but only managed to play three more NHL games, going pointless. He did though have another highly productive season, this time for the Maine Mariners where he scored 12 goals and 45 points in just 61 games.

He returned to his homeland in 1992, playing for his hometown team Stadion Hradec Králové, who were playing in the Czechoslovakian Second Division. The team won promotion to the newly formed Czech Extraliga which was formed after the breakup of Czechoslovakia in 1993, but only managed to play 17 games in a season which saw them relegated. It was his final season as he retired shortly afterwards.

Career statistics

Regular season and playoffs

International

External links

1965 births
Living people
HC Dynamo Pardubice players
Boston Bruins players
Czech ice hockey defencemen
Czechoslovak ice hockey defencemen
Czechoslovak expatriate sportspeople in the United States
Los Angeles Kings draft picks
Los Angeles Kings players
Maine Mariners players
New Haven Nighthawks players
Sportspeople from Hradec Králové
Phoenix Roadrunners (IHL) players
Stadion Hradec Králové players
Czech expatriate ice hockey players in the United States
Czechoslovak expatriate ice hockey people